This is a list of the butterflies of family Lycaenidae, or the "blues", which are found in Sri Lanka. It is part of the List of the butterflies of Sri Lanka

Subfamily Polyommatinae

Genus Actyolepis

Genus Anthene

Genus Azanus

Genus Caleta

Genus Castalius

Genus Catochrysops

Genus Celastrina

Genus Chilades

Genus Cupido

Genus Discolampa

Genus Euchrysops

Genus Freyeria

Genus Ionolyce

Genus Jamides

Genus Lampides

Genus Luthrodes

Genus Megisba

Genus Nacaduba

Genus Neopithecops

Genus Petrelaea

Genus Prosotas

Genus Syntarucus

Genus Talicada

Genus Tarucus

Genus Udara

Genus Zizeeria

Genus Zizina

Subfamily Curetinae

Genus Curetis

Subfamily Miletinae

Genus Spalgis

Subfamily Aphnaeinae

Genus Cigaritis
Variously placed in Spindasis and Aphnaeus

Subfamily Theclinae

Genus Amblypodia

Genus Arhopala

Genus Bindahara

Genus Catapaecilma

Genus Cheritra

Genus Deudorix

Genus Horaga

Genus Hypolycaena

Genus Iraota

Genus Loxura

Genus Pratapa

Genus Rathinda

Genus Rapala

Genus Surendra

Genus Tajuria

Genus Virachola

Genus Zesius

References
Bernard d'Abrera (1986) Butterflies of the Oriental Region. Part 3: Lycaenidae and Riodinidae Hill House Publishers 
D'Abrera, B.L. (1998) The Butterflies of Ceylon. Hill House: Melbourne; London. 224 pp. 

Lists of butterflies of Sri Lanka
Lycaenidae